Bayes Marshall Norton (September 23, 1903 – October 21, 1967) was an American sprint runner. In 1924 he finished second in the 200 m at the U.S. Olympic Trials and fifth at the 1924 Olympic Games. He won a Rhodes Scholarship and in the late 1920s ran for the University of Oxford. He later became a professor of chemistry at Kenyon College in Gambier, Ohio. As a government consultant he contributed to the Manhattan Project and to Rockets, Guns and Targets, an official U.S. Government history book on science during World War II.

References

External links
 

1903 births
1967 deaths
American male sprinters
Olympic track and field athletes of the United States
Athletes (track and field) at the 1924 Summer Olympics
People from Tisbury, Massachusetts
People from Gambier, Ohio